Mamakavah (also Romanized as Māmakāvah; also known as Mamaga and Māmakāvā) is a village in Gavork-e Nalin Rural District, Vazineh District, Sardasht County, West Azerbaijan Province, Iran. At the 2006 census, its population was 397, in 75 families.

References 

Populated places in Sardasht County